Flatman (Matt) is a fictional mutant superhero appearing in American comic books published by Marvel Comics. He is a member of the Great Lakes Avengers.

Publication history
Created by John Byrne, Flatman first appeared in the pages of West Coast Avengers #46 in 1989.

Fictional character biography
Flatman's real name is actually Matt. After dropping out of community college, he worked as a barista when he was approached by a party organizer named Andrew. Matt worked for him pretending to be Mister Fantastic. He grew sick of the job and changed his name to Dr. Val Ventura in the hopes of becoming a superhero.

Flatman became a member and second-in-command of the Great Lakes Avengers, an unauthorized division of the regular Avengers superhero group. The GLA watches over the Wisconsin area. Although no true origin was given at first for his stretching abilities and odd appearance, it was later revealed that he is a mutant.

He was first seen in public with the team by Hawkeye and Mockingbird, who later agreed to become their mentors. With the team, he helped Hawkeye and the West Coast Avengers against "That Which Endures". They also assisted Mockingbird in a holding action against Terminus. After aiding the Thunderbolts against the villain Graviton, the team clashed with the mercenary Deadpool.

Called the "2-D Avenger", his primary roles include long-ranged rescues and helping the team solve crimes with his extensive knowledge of fashion which he was reported to have "studied in college". He was able to identify a woman's shoe and describe it in detail, and later rescued Weasel — referring to him as "sailor" — which led his team to question his sexuality.

At first, Flatman denied any claims that he is gay. However, when a new Avenger recruit called Living Lightning first approached the Great Lakes Avengers (usually abbreviated as GLA), he thought they were actually the Gay/Lesbian Alliance. After apologizing, he left quickly, but his willingness to come out to others gave Flatman the courage to do it himself. He revealed that he is in fact gay to his teammates, though he felt one-upped by Mr. Immortal being dubbed the pinnacle of human evolution (using the ambiguous phrase "Homo Supreme").

Over time, Flatman's doctoral degree began to come into question. He is not able to present a degree to prove his education and when asked by Doorman what he was a doctor of, he replies that he is a doctor of "stuff". When told by a fellow doctor (who had confused him for Mr. Fantastic) that time moved in only a single direction, Flatman asked which direction that was.

GLA: Misassembled
During the G.L.A. mini-series, the team took on Maelstrom who was trying to destroy the universe. After Dinah Soar's death, Mr. Immortal suffered a nervous break down and Flatman stepped up as deputy leader. Deciding that the team needed some new members, he and Doorman went to New York City where they failed to recruit dozens of heroes. While in Central Park, they are saved by Squirrel Girl and her sidekick Monkey Joe from muggers. They later offer her to join the team and she accepts. Soon after, they hear an alarm on a nearby factory and encounter the Grasshopper, who was battling Batroc the Leaper and his lackeys. During the battle, Flatman offers Grasshopper membership in the team and he accepts. Seconds later, Zaran, one of Batroc's minions, kills him. Refusing to let the deaths of Dinah Soar and Grasshopper get him down, Flatman continued to try to persuade the team to further research Maelstrom's plans for universal destruction. However, it was not until Mr. Immortal regained his sanity that the team rallied together to defeat Maelstrom. During the final battle, Big Bertha tried to save Flatman, who was seemingly sucked into a vortex created from Maelstrom's device. However, it turned out that only his clothes had been sucked off and he was merely standing at an extreme angle so he wouldn't be seen naked. With the GLA possessing a stronger resolve than ever, they returned to their headquarters only for Flatman to find that Tony Stark had sent a cease and desist notice ordering them to stop using the Avengers name. After discovering that they were all mutants, the team changed their name to the Great Lakes X-Men, complete with new costumes.

GLX-Mas Special
During the GLX-Mas Special, the team confronted Dr. Tannenbaum, who had released an army of living Christmas trees on the citizens of Wisconsin.

Great Lakes Champions
The team was invited to the annual Superheroes Poker Tournament. In the end, Flatman won the tournament with a straight-flush, beating the Thing's four fours. After being discouraged from using the names "Great Lakes X-Men" and "Great Lakes Defenders" by members of those teams present at the tournament, and since Flatman was the champion of the tournament, the team was inspired to rename themselves the Great Lakes Champions, despite protests from former Champions of Los Angeles member Hercules.

Civil War/The Initiative
All of the Great Lakes Champions registered with the United States government as required by the Superhuman Registration Act, as revealed when Deadpool mistakenly attempted to apprehend them for violating the Act, only to be defeated and informed that they had already registered.

Flatman has been identified as one of the 142 registered superheroes who are part of the Initiative.

Flatman and his teammates became the Initiative group in charge of Wisconsin, calling themselves the Great Lakes Initiative. They were given a rescue mission to save Dionysus after he fell from Mount Olympus and was captured by A.I.M., who planned to use his powers to cause mental instability on all the superheroes they consider a threat. During the task, Flatman and Mr. Immortal were ambushed by Deadpool. Flatman instead recruited him as a reserve member of the team, but the mercenary eventually overstayed his welcome. The two came to blows over Deadpool's financial misadventures, and Flatman unveiled 'Origami Fu', but was defeated when he became a boat at Deadpool's urgings. The merc stapled him together and used him in the bath. Finally, Squirrel Girl kicked Deadpool out of the team.

Secret Invasion
During the Secret Invasion storyline, the team confronted a Skrull disguised as Grasshopper, with help from Gravity and Catwalk. During the battle, Flatman invites Gravity to join the team but he quickly rejects the offer. They later appeared to welcome Gravity as leader of the team, after he was transferred to Wisconsin by Norman Osborn.

Fear Itself
During the Fear Itself storyline, the team confronts Asbestos Man, who takes advantage of the fear and chaos that is happening. None of the group actually wish to touch the man due to the toxicity of his suit. Mr. Immortal talks him into giving up in return for being remembered by the others.

Great Lakes Avengers (2016 series)
In the ongoing series The Great Lakes Avengers, it is revealed that the team had disbanded and gone their separate ways. Flatman had written a mostly exaggerated autobiography book and has been living off the residual checks from it. He then receives a visit from Connie Ferrari, a lawyer representing the real Avengers, who informs him that the GLA has been reinstated as a permanent addition to the Avengers. He meets with Big Bertha and Doorman at a diner, while expressing concern that Mr. Immortal and Squirrel Girl haven't answered his call. The team is later relocated to Detroit, Michigan where they meet a local girl named Pansy at their new headquarters, a factory owned by Tony Stark. The team then goes to a local bar to try to convince the owner to turn down the music. The owner Naine Rogue instead refuses and begins to insult them, particularly Mr. Immortal and Big Bertha. Upon getting arrested after a fight, Doorman escapes leaving Flatman and Bertha to deal with a young girl named Goodness Silva who can transform into a werewolf, attacking the police inside the station. They are later released thanks to Connie Ferrari despite the accusations of councilman Dick Snerd, who is actually Naine Rouge. After the team discovers that Dick Snerd shut them down, Mr. Immortal returns and goes on patrol with Flatman, while Bertha, Doorman and Good Boy go to Nain Rogue's bar to find clues. During their patrol, Flatman and Mr. Immortal resolve their issues with each other and agree to work together. Returning to HQ, Mr. Immortal and Flatman learned that Bertha and Good Boy took Dick Snerd (Nain Rouge) hostage. When Connie visits the base, they attempt to keep Snerd's abduction secret but she quickly finds out. After seeing that Good Boy brutalized Snerd, the team drops him off at the hospital.

After Connie tells the team to lie low for a couple of days, Bertha goes to a modeling gig while Flatman and Mr. Immortal are visited by Good Boy's brother Lucky, who tells her that they need to leave town due to what she did to Nain Rogue. Later, while fixing the Flatmobile, Flatman and Mr. Immortal receive a text message from Bertha, who was injured while fighting Dr. Nod and his squad.  During the battle, Dr. Nod takes more of the weight-loss supplements, becoming much bigger and monstrous. On Mr. Immortal's suggestion, the team performs a maneuver that has Doorman and Mr. Immortal get inside Dr. Nod's body, where Mr. Immortal manages to kill him by punching his heart. After their victory, the team is visited by Deadpool who tells them that they've been fired and can no longer use the Avengers name, leaving them confused.

Powers and abilities
Flatman has the ability to stretch any part of his body to great lengths (although not nearly as long or complex as Mister Fantastic). He can withstand all forms of physical injury at a superhuman level, appear to be nearly invisible by standing at just the right angle and slip through very thin spaces, thanks to his nearly two-dimensional body. He can also turn his entire body into any shape, including animals such as frogs or monkeys, in the style of origami. Initially, he never appeared to be able to assume a "normal" three-dimensional shape. However, in the ongoing series The Great Lakes Avengers, he reveals that he can assume that shape at will. He is also an excellent hand-to-hand combatant.

In other media

Television

 Flatman appears in the Fantastic Four: World's Greatest Heroes episode "The Cure", voiced by Brian Dobson. In the episode, the Thing's "condition" had been cured and the team was holding auditions for possible replacements with Flatman being one of the candidates alongside Captain Ultra, Frog-Man, She-Hulk, Squirrel Girl, and Texas Twister. Flatman's audition consisted of demonstrating his powers and stating "I can stretch, too!", before being immediately dismissed by Reed Richards.
 Flatman appears in The Super Hero Squad Show episode "The Ice Melt Cometh!", voiced by Jonathan Mankuta. He speaks at a seminar in the presence of Reptil talking about the polar ice caps. Throughout the episode, he denies the existence of global warming despite the fact that the icecaps have actually melted due to the self-destructing of a spinning machine that Trapster, Pyro, and Zzzax were using.

Toys
 The one-shot GLX-Mas Special features a Flatman "action figure" on its last page, with "infinite" points of articulation; it is of course a paper doll.  It features three phrases that can be provided by the user (speech balloons), one of which is "I'm not Mr. Fantastic!".

References

External links
 Flatman at Marvel.com
 Flatman at Marvel Database
 Flatman at Comic Vine
 Flatman at Writeups.org

Avengers (comics) characters
Characters created by John Byrne (comics)
Comics characters introduced in 1989
Marvel Comics characters who are shapeshifters
Fictional characters who can stretch themselves
Fictional gay males
Marvel Comics LGBT superheroes
Marvel Comics mutants